A list of British films released in 1995.

1995

See also
 1995 in film
 1995 in British music
 1995 in British radio
 1995 in British television
 1995 in the United Kingdom
 List of 1995 box office number-one films in the United Kingdom

References

External links

1995
Films
Lists of 1995 films by country or language